The 1987 Campeonato Nacional was Chilean football league top tier's 57th season. Universidad Católica was the tournament's champion, winning its sixth title.

League table

Results

Topscorer

Liguilla Pre-Copa Libertadores

Promotion/relegation Liguilla

See also
1987 Copa Lan Chile

References

External links 
ANFP 
RSSSF Chile 1987

Primera División de Chile seasons
Chile
Primera